The page is the comprehensive list of Kirati kings who ruled in Nepal.<blue>

List of Kirat Kings
According to Mahabharata, a chronicle of Bansawali William Kirk Patrick and Daniel Wright, The Kirat kings were
 King Shree Yelam - 90 years/१। राजा श्री एलम् - ९० वर्ष, 
 King Shree Pelam - 81 years/राजा श्री पेलं - ८१ वर्ष, 
 King Shree Melam - 89 years/राजा श्री मेलं - ८९ वर्ष, 
 King Shree Changming - 42 years/राजा श्री चंमिं - ४२ वर्ष, 
 King Shree Dhakang - 37 years/राजा श्री धस्कं - ३७ वर्ष, 
 King Shree Walangcha - 31 years 6 months/राजा श्री वलंच - ३१ वर्ष ६ महिना, 
 King Shree Hungting - 40 years 8 months/राजा श्री हुतिं - ४० वर्ष ८ महिना, 
 King Shree Hoorma - 50 years/राजा श्री हुरमा - ५० वर्ष, 
 King Shree Tooske - 41 years 8 months/राजा श्री तुस्के - ४१ वर्ष ८ महिना, 
 King Shree Prasaphung - 38 years 6 months/राजा श्री प्रसफुं - ३८ वर्ष ६ महिना, 
 King Shree Pawa: - 46 years/राजा श्री पवः - ४६ वर्ष, 
 King Shree Daasti - 40 years/राजा श्री दास्ती - ४० वर्ष, 
 King Shree Chamba - 71 years/राजा श्री चम्ब - ७१ वर्ष, 
 King Shree Kongkong - 54 years/राजा श्री कंकं - ५४ वर्ष, 
 King Shree Swananda - 40 years 6 months/राजा श्री स्वनन्द - ४० वर्ष ६ महिना, 
 King Shree Phukong - 58 years/राजा श्री फुकों - ५८ वर्ष, 
 King Shree Singhu - 49 years 6 months/राजा श्री शिंघु - ४९ वर्ष ६ महिना, 
 King Shree Joolam - 73 years 3 months/राजा श्री जुलम् - ७३ वर्ष ३ महिना, 
 King Shree Lookang - 40 years/राजा श्री लुकं - ४० वर्ष, 
 King Shree Thoram - 71 years/राजा श्री थोरम् - ७१ वर्ष, 
 King Shree Thuko - 83 years/राजा श्री थुको - ८३ वर्ष, 
 King Shree Barmma - 73 years 6 months/राजा श्री वर्म्म - ७३ वर्ष ६ महिना, 
 King Shree Gunjong - 72 years 7 months/राजा श्री गुंजं ७२ वर्ष ७ महिना, 
 King Shree Pushka - 81 years/राजा श्री पुस्क - ८१ वर्ष, 
 King Shree Tyapamee - 54 years/राजा श्री त्यपमि - ५४ वर्ष, 
 King Shree Moogmam - 58 years/राजा श्री मुगमम् - ५८ वर्ष, 
 King Shree Shasaru - 63 years/राजा श्री शसरू - ६३ वर्ष, 
 King Shree Goongoong - 74 years/राजा श्री गंणं - ७४ वर्ष, 
 King Shree Khimbung - 76 years/राजा श्री खिम्बुं - ७६ वर्ष, 
 King Shree Girijung - 81 years/राजा श्री गिरीजं - ८१ वर्ष, 
 King Shree Khurangja - 78 years/राजा श्री खुरांज - ७८ वर्ष, 
 King Shree Gasti - 58 years/राजा श्री खिगु - ८५ वर्ष

References

Further reading
  "Himalayan Kirata," Tripura.org.in
  Office of the Nepal Antiquary, Nepal Antiquary, Issue 7, page 22 
 C. Iman Singh 2003, History and culture of Kirat people, Kirat Yakthung Chumlung

Kirati
Kirati